XEKAM-AM is a Spanish news/talk radio station in Rosarito, Baja California. XEKAM broadcasts on 950 kHz and carries Radio Fórmula programming.

XEKAM-AM broadcasts in HD.

History
XEGM-AM received its concession on November 10, 1961. It was owned by Gustavo Faist Morán's Difusoras del Valle, S.A., and broadcast with 2,500 watts of power. By the late 1960s, XEGM had increased its power to 10,000 watts day/5,000 watts night.

In the late 1980s, the callsign was changed to XEKAM-AM. During this time, XEKAM (frequently referred to in US media as XEK-AM, though the actual XEK-AM was in Nuevo Laredo) was programmed from the United States, with studios in Hollywood, California. It shut down for a time in 1992 after failing to obtain the necessary FCC permits to originate programming for air on a foreign station. Programming on XEKAM at the time was of a news-talk format in English and included the first talk show devoted to gay issues in the area as well as San Diego Gulls hockey games; when the station was forced off the air, the Gulls went without a radio partner for a month. The loss of the station's US programming sent the station into a tailspin and off the air: employees went unpaid and the locks at the station's US offices were changed.

In 1998, the concession for XEKAM was transferred to a Radio Fórmula subsidiary.

References

External links
Radio Fórmula

Spanish-language radio stations
News and talk radio stations in Mexico
Radio stations in Baja California
Radio Fórmula